The following species in the flowering plant genus Ferula are accepted by Plants of the World Online. Reticulate evolution, as revealed by incongruities between nuclear DNA and chloroplast DNA in some species, has led to taxonomic difficulties in this genus.

Ferula afghanica 
Ferula akitschkensis 
Ferula alaica 
Ferula alliacea 
Ferula amanicola 
Ferula ammoniacum 
Ferula anatolica 
Ferula angreni 
Ferula armandi 
Ferula arnoldiana 
Ferula arrigonii 
Ferula assa-foetida 
Ferula atlantica 
Ferula aucheri 
Ferula badrakema 
Ferula baluchistanica 
Ferula barbeyi 
Ferula behboudiana 
Ferula bilasi 
Ferula biverticellata 
Ferula blanchei 
Ferula botschantzevii 
Ferula brevipedicellata 
Ferula bungeana 
Ferula calcarea 
Ferula canescens 
Ferula caspica 
Ferula ceratophylla 
Ferula clematidifolia 
Ferula communis 
Ferula conocaula 
Ferula coskunii 
Ferula costata 
Ferula cupularis 
Ferula cypria 
Ferula czatkalensis 
Ferula daninii 
Ferula decurrens 
Ferula dictyocarpa 
Ferula dissecta 
Ferula divaricata 
Ferula diversivittata 
Ferula downieorum 
Ferula drudeana 
Ferula dshizakensis 
Ferula dubjanskyi 
Ferula duranii 
Ferula elaeochytris 
Ferula elbursensis 
Ferula equisetacea 
Ferula euxina 
Ferula fedoroviorum 
Ferula fedtschenkoana 
Ferula ferganensis 
Ferula flabelliloba 
Ferula foetida 
Ferula foetidissima 
Ferula fontqueri 
Ferula fukanensis 
Ferula gabrielii 
Ferula ghorana 
Ferula gigantea 
Ferula glaberrima 
Ferula glabra 
Ferula glabrifolia 
Ferula glauca 
Ferula glaucopruinosa 
Ferula gouliminensis 
Ferula gracilis 
Ferula grigoriewii 
Ferula groessingii 
Ferula gummosa 
Ferula gypsacea 
Ferula halophila 
Ferula haussknechtii 
Ferula hedgeana 
Ferula heratensis 
Ferula hermonis 
Ferula heuffelii 
Ferula hexiensis 
Ferula hezarlalehzarica 
Ferula hindukushensis 
Ferula hissarica 
Ferula huber-morathii 
Ferula hyrcana 
Ferula iliensis 
Ferula incisoserrata 
Ferula jaeschkeana 
Ferula juniperina 
Ferula karakalensis 
Ferula karakumica 
Ferula karatavica 
Ferula karataviensis 
Ferula karategina 
Ferula karelinii 
Ferula kashanica 
Ferula kelifi 
Ferula kelleri 
Ferula kingdon-wardii 
Ferula kirialovii 
Ferula kokanica 
Ferula korshinskyi 
Ferula koso-poljanskyi 
Ferula krylovii 
Ferula kuhistanica 
Ferula kyzylkumica 
Ferula lancerotensis 
Ferula lapidosa 
Ferula laseroides 
Ferula latiloba 
Ferula latipinna 
Ferula latisecta 
Ferula lehmannii 
Ferula leiophylla 
Ferula leucographa 
Ferula licentiana 
Ferula linczevskii 
Ferula lipskyi 
Ferula lithophila 
Ferula litwinowiana 
Ferula longifolia 
Ferula longipedunculata 
Ferula longipes 
Ferula loscosii 
Ferula lutensis 
Ferula lycia 
Ferula macrocolea 
Ferula malacophylla 
Ferula marmarica 
Ferula melitensis 
Ferula mervynii 
Ferula michaelii 
Ferula microcolea 
Ferula mikraskythiana 
Ferula mogoltavica 
Ferula mongolica 
Ferula moschata 
Ferula myrioloba 
Ferula narthex 
Ferula negevensis 
Ferula nevskii 
Ferula nuda 
Ferula nuratavica 
Ferula nuristanica 
Ferula olivacea 
Ferula oopoda 
Ferula orbicularis 
Ferula orientalis 
Ferula ovczinnikovii 
Ferula ovina 
Ferula pachycaulos 
Ferula pachyphylla 
Ferula paeoniifolia 
Ferula pallida 
Ferula palmyrensis 
Ferula paniculata 
Ferula parva 
Ferula penninervis 
Ferula persica 
Ferula pimenovii 
Ferula pisidica 
Ferula plurivittata 
Ferula porandica 
Ferula potaninii 
Ferula prangifolia 
Ferula pratovii 
Ferula pseudalliacea 
Ferula racemosoumbellata 
Ferula rechingeri 
Ferula renardii 
Ferula rigidula 
Ferula rubricaulis 
Ferula rubroarenosa 
Ferula rutbaensis 
Ferula sadleriana 
Ferula samariae 
Ferula samarkandica 
Ferula sauvagei 
Ferula schtschurowskiana 
Ferula seravschanica 
Ferula serpentinica 
Ferula sharifii 
Ferula shehbaziana 
Ferula sibirica 
Ferula sinaica 
Ferula sinkiangensis 
Ferula sjugatensis 
Ferula songarica 
Ferula sphenobasis 
Ferula stenocarpa 
Ferula stenoloba 
Ferula stewartiana 
Ferula subtilis 
Ferula sugatensis 
Ferula syreitschikowii 
Ferula szowitsiana 
Ferula tabasensis 
Ferula tadshikorum 
Ferula tatarica 
Ferula taucumica 
Ferula tenuisecta 
Ferula tenuissima 
Ferula teterrima 
Ferula thomsonii 
Ferula tingitana 
Ferula trachelocarpa 
Ferula trachyphylla 
Ferula transiliensis 
Ferula tschimganica 
Ferula tschuiliensis 
Ferula tuberifera 
Ferula tunetana 
Ferula ugamica 
Ferula varia 
Ferula vesceritensis 
Ferula vicaria 
Ferula violacea 
Ferula xanthocarpa 
Ferula xeromorpha 
Ferula xylorhachis

References

Ferula